Ectopatria mniodes is a moth of the family Noctuidae. It is found in the Australian Capital Territory, New South Wales, the Northern Territory and Queensland.

External links
Australian Faunal Directory

Moths of Australia
Noctuinae
Moths described in 1902